Bairstow is a surname. Notable people with the surname include:

Sports people

 Andrew Bairstow (born 1975), English cricketer, son of David Bairstow
 Arthur Bairstow (1868–1945), English cricketer 
 Cameron Bairstow (born 1990), Australian basketball player
 David Bairstow (1951–1998), English cricketer
 Ernest C. Bairstow (1876–1962), Anglo-American architectural sculptor 
 Jonny Bairstow (born 1989), English cricketer, son of David Bairstow
 Mark Bairstow (born 1963), former Australian rules footballer
 Angela Bairstow (1942-2016), English international badminton player

Other
 Sir Edward Bairstow (1874–1946), English organist and composer
 Jack E. Bairstow (1902–1963), American politician
 Leonard Bairstow (1880–1963), English academic, originator of Bairstow's method for finding the roots of polynomials
 Scott Bairstow (born 1970), Canadian actor
 Caitlyn Bairstow Canadian voice actor

See also
 Bairstow Eves, a British estate agents